SS John Mitchell may refer to the following ships:

 , American lake freighter
 , American Liberty ship

Ship names